Salvador Romero Valencia (born 30 October 1960) is a former Mexican politician previously affiliated with the PRI. As of 2012 up to August 31, 2015 he served as Federal Deputy of the LXII Legislature of the Mexican Congress representing Jiquilpan, Michoacán. Romero Valencia decided to retire from politics following his term in office and is now fully dedicated to his business affairs.

References

1960 births
Living people
People from Jiquilpan, Michoacán
Institutional Revolutionary Party politicians
21st-century Mexican politicians
Politicians from Michoacán
University of Guadalajara alumni
Members of the Chamber of Deputies (Mexico) for Michoacán